The Janssen Medal can refer to:

The Prix Jules Janssen, awarded by the Société astronomique de France (French Astronomical Society)
The Janssen Medal (French Academy of Sciences), awarded by the French Academy of Sciences
The Janssen Medal of the French Photographic Society
Various awards named after Paul Janssen, such as the Dr. Paul Janssen Award for Biomedical Research